Ritmos del Caribe (Caribbean Rhythms) is a Mexican musical film directed by Juan José Ortega. It was released in 1950 and starring Amalia Aguilar and Rafael Baledón.

Plot
A Cuban rumbera undergoes an ordeal to fall in love with a Mexican doctor. The problem between the two is that the man is married.

Cast
 Amalia Aguilar
 Rafael Baledón
 Susana Guízar
 Rita Montaner
 Roberto Cobo
 La Sonora Matancera
 Los Panchos

Reviews
Shortly before starring in the film Al son del mambo (1950), the Cuban rumbera Amalia Aguilar  highlights of this musical film with a minimal plot. Fortunately, the dramatic moments of the film are buried by musical interventions of Daniel Santos, Bienvenido Granda, La Sonora Matancera, Los Panchos, Rita Montaner and the explosive presence of Amalia, who brings a sensuality and rhythm out of series.

References

External links
 
 Abandomoviez: Ritmos del caribe

1950 films
Mexican black-and-white films
Film revues
Mexican musical films
Rumberas films
1950s Spanish-language films
1950 musical films
1950s Mexican films